The Whitewood Limestone is a geologic formation in South Dakota. It preserves fossils dating back to the Ordovician period.

See also

 List of fossiliferous stratigraphic units in South Dakota
 Paleontology in South Dakota

References
 

Ordovician geology of South Dakota
Ordovician southern paleotropical deposits